This article lists the presidents of the Assembly of Extremadura, the regional legislature of Extremadura.

Presidents

References

Extremadura